John Russon (born 1960) is a Canadian philosopher, working primarily in the tradition of Continental Philosophy. In 2006, he was named Presidential Distinguished Professor at the University of Guelph, and in 2011 he was the Shastri Indo-Canadian Institute's Canadian Lecturer to India.

Education
Russon received his Ph.D. in 1990 from the University of Toronto.  His dissertation was entitled Hegel on the Body.

Research
Russon is known for his original philosophical contributions, and also for his scholarly interpretations of G.W.F. Hegel, Contemporary Continental Philosophy and Ancient Philosophy.

Original philosophy
Russon is known as an original philosopher, primarily through his books Human Experience, Bearing Witness to Epiphany, and Sites of Exposure.  Leonard Lawlor describes Russon as "one of the few original voices working in Continental Philosophy today."  Human Experience, which won the 2005 Broadview Press/Canadian Philosophical Association Book Prize, brought together themes from Hegel, Contemporary Continental Philosophy and Ancient Philosophy, and produced an original interpretation of the development of personal identity.  In this work Russon argues that the experiences through which we are inaugurated into any distinctive domain of meaning necessarily leave the stamp of their specific (and contingent) character on our subsequent experiences in that domain.  He uses this notion to interpret the significance of family experience in the formation of personal identity, and he finds this aspect of our experience to be the key to understanding mental health (and mental illness).
Russon's approach to mental health—in particular his interpretation of neurosis—is specially striking for its bringing together of the theme of embodiment that has been prominent in existential phenomenology with the theme of dialectical self-transformation that is prominent in the philosophy of Hegel and with the theme of the "system" of family life that is prominent in the work of such psychologists and family theorists as Salvador Minuchin, R.D. Laing and D.W. Winnicott.  This work is also important for its use of these ideas to criticize the "individualist" premises of much political and economic theory, and to develop of a political theory of multiculturalism.  His interpretation of the dynamic and transformative role of sexuality (eros) provides an important link between his work and the philosophy of Plato.
The importance of sexuality to personal development, and especially its relationship to ethical life and to artistic creativity is further explored in Bearing Witness to Epiphany.  Like Human Experience, this work stands out for its emphasis on the way that the important dimensions of our experience are embodied in the most basic material dimensions of our lives—everyday "things" and basic bodily practices—and this work thus offers a new metaphysics of "the thing" and of reality in general, arguing that issues of metaphysics cannot be separated from issues of ethics.  His most recent book, Sites of Exposure, broadens the perspective of these earlier books to address issues of politics and history.  Russon analyzes the dynamic process by which we make ourselves at home in a culture, and at the same time come into conflict with other cultures.  Investigating this process throughout history, with a special emphasis on ancient Athenian democracy, the history of Islam, and the history of British Empire in Asia, Russon argues for a pluralist multiculturalism as the only viable political direction.  He concludes the book with a study of art, which is relevant because it is art that can transform our perspective in a way that opens us to the new possibilities of social and cultural life that are necessary if we are to get beyond simple situations of cultural conflict.  He offers original studies of Thomas Cole, Rachel Whiteread, Anselm Kiefer, and Gerhard Richter, among others.

History of philosophy
In addition to his original philosophical contributions, Russon has also published substantial scholarly work in the history of philosophy.

Hegel
Though his doctoral supervisor was the Heidegger scholar Graeme Nicholson, his interpretation of Hegel's philosophy is more often thought of as continuing the tradition of his teacher H.S. Harris (1926–2007), the pre-eminent Hegel scholar in the English-speaking world.  Russon's Hegel-interpretation is also distinctive because of its attempt to show the continuity of Hegel's philosophy with the philosophical traditions of phenomenology, existentialism and deconstruction.  This interpretation has been developed through many scholarly articles, and especially through three books: The Self and Its Body in Hegel's Phenomenology of Spirit, Reading Hegel's Phenomenology, and Infinite Phenomenology: The Lessons of Hegel's Science of Experience.

Contemporary Continental philosophy
Russon's philosophical orientation is largely derived from existential phenomenology, and he has published a number of scholarly articles in this area, especially focusing on the work of Martin Heidegger, Maurice Merleau-Ponty and Jacques Derrida.  His most recent works include, "The Self as Resolution: Heidegger, Derrida and the Intimacy of the Question of the Meaning of Being," and "The Spatiality of Self-Consciousness: Originary Passivity in Kant, Merleau-Ponty and Derrida."

Ancient philosophy
Russon is also known as a scholar of ancient philosophy, especially for his use of the methods of 20th Century European philosophy (phenomenology, hermeneutics and deconstruction) to interpret the texts of Plato and Aristotle.  Along with John Sallis, he organized an influential conference at the Pennsylvania State University in 1997 entitled "Retracing the Platonic Text," (the papers from which were published as Retracing the Platonic Text by Northwestern University Press in 2000).  This conference helped to inaugurate the growing North American movement to interpret the texts of Greek Philosophy through the lens of Contemporary Continental Philosophy, a movement especially associated with the Ancient Philosophy Society.  He is currently the editor of a book series from Northwestern University Press entitled Rereading Ancient Philosophy, a series that publishes books on ancient philosophy that are informed by the insights of continental philosophy.

Teaching
Russon has supervised the dissertations of many current professors of philosophy across North America on topics in Plato, Aristotle, Georg Wilhelm Friedrich Hegel, Karl Marx, Edmund Husserl, Martin Heidegger, John Dewey and Maurice Merleau-Ponty.
Russon has held academic appointments at Harvard University, the University of Toronto, Acadia University, the Pennsylvania State University, Stony Brook University, and the University of Guelph.
He is also the founder and main organizer of the Toronto Seminar, an annual private seminar for the study of philosophy, held in Toronto, Ontario, Canada.

Select bibliography

Books
Sites of Exposure: Art, Politics, and the Nature of Experience, (Bloomington and Indianapolis: Indiana University Press, 2017). 
Infinite Phenomenology: The Lessons of Hegel's Science of Experience, (Evanston: Northwestern University Press, 2016). 
Bearing Witness to Epiphany: Persons, Things and the Nature of Erotic Life, (Albany: State University of New York Press, 2009). 
Reading Hegel's Phenomenology, (Bloomington and Indianapolis: Indiana University Press, 2004). 
Human Experience: Philosophy, Neurosis and the Elements of Everyday Life, (Albany: State University of New York Press, 2003). 
The Self and Its Body in Hegel's Phenomenology of Spirit, (Toronto: University of Toronto Press, 1997).

Edited books
Perception and Its Development in Merleau-Ponty's Phenomenology, co-edited with Kirsten Jacobson, (Toronto: University of Toronto Press, 2017). 
Reexamining Socrates in the Apology, co-edited with Patricia Fagan, (Evanston: Northwestern University Press, 2009). 
Retracing the Platonic Text, co-edited with John Sallis, (Evanston: Northwestern University Press, 2000). 
Hegel and the Tradition: Essays in Honour of H.S. Harris, co-edited with Michael Baur, (Toronto: University of Toronto Press, 1997).

Selected articles in the history and problems of philosophy
"Personality as Equilibrium: Fragility and Plasticity in (Inter)Personal Identity," Phenomenology and the Cognitive Sciences, (2017).
"The Right to Become an Individual," Anekaant, 3 (2015): 17-22.
"Between Two Intimacies: The Formative Contexts of Adult Individuality," Emotion, Space and Society, 13 (2014): 65-70.
"Haunted by History: Merleau-Ponty, Hegel, and the Phenomenology of Pain," Journal of Contemporary Thought, (2013): 34-51.
"The Self as Resolution: Heidegger, Derrida and the Intimacy of the Question of the Meaning of Being," Research in Phenomenology, 38 (2008): 90-110.
"Temporality and the Future of Philosophy in Hegel," International Philosophical Quarterly, 48(2008): 59-68.
"Spatiality and Self-Consciousness: Originary Passivity in Kant, Merleau-Ponty and Derrida," Chiasmi International, 9 (2007): 219-232.
"Reading: Derrida in Hegel's Understanding," Research in Phenomenology, 36 (2006): 181-200.
"Merleau-Ponty and the New Science of the Soul," Chiasmi International, 8 (2006): 129-138.
"The Intersubjective Path from Body to Mind," Dialogue, 45 (2006): 307-314.
"The Virtue of Stoicism: On First Principles in Philosophy and Life," Dialogue, 45 (2006): 347-354.
"The Elements of Everyday Life: Three Lessons from Ancient Greece," Philosophy in the Contemporary World, 13,2 (2006): 84-90.
"Eros and Education: Plato’s Transformative Epistemology," Laval Théologique et Philosophique, 56 (2000):113-125.
"The Metaphysics of Consciousness and the Hermeneutics of Social Life: Hegel’s Phenomenological System," Southern Journal of Philosophy, 36 (1998) :81-101.
"Self-Consciousness and the Tradition in Aristotle's Psychology," Laval Théologique et Philosophique, 52 (1996): 777-803.
"Aristotle’s Animative Epistemology," Idealistic Studies, 25 (1995):241-253.
"Heidegger, Hegel and Ethnicity: The Ritual Basis of Self-Identity," Southern Journal of Philosophy, 33 (1995): 509-532.
"Hermeneutics and Plato’s Ion," Clio, 24 (1995): 399-418.
"Embodiment and Responsibility: Merleau-Ponty and the Ontology of Nature," Man and World, 27 (1994): 291-308.

Notes

External links
 Official website
 John Russon's homepage at the University of Guelph.
 [http://ndpr.nd.edu/review.cfm?id=2941 Review of Russon's Reading Hegel's Phenomenology'']  at Notre Dame Philosophical Reviews''.

1960 births
Living people
20th-century American philosophers
21st-century American philosophers
Continental philosophers
Canadian philosophers
University of Toronto alumni
Heidegger scholars